Taal Lake, formerly known as Bombón Lake, is a freshwater caldera lake in the province of Batangas, on the island of Luzon in the Philippines.  The lake fills Taal Volcano, a large volcanic caldera formed by very large eruptions between 500,000 and 100,000 years ago. 

It is the country's third-largest lake, after Laguna de Bay and Lake Lanao. Volcano Island, the location of Taal Volcano's historical eruptions and responsible for the lake's sulfuric content, lies near the center of the lake. 

Up until the 2020 eruption of Taal Volcano there was a crater lake on Volcano Island. It was known as Yellow Lake and Main Crater Lake and contained its own small island, Vulcan Point. Vulcan Point was thought to be one of few third-order islands in the world.

Protected area and management 
The Taal Lake basin was first declared as a national park, known as the Taal Volcano National Park, by Proclamation No. 235 on July 22, 1967, covering .

Under Republic Act No. 7586, or the National Integrated Protected Areas System (NIPAS) Act of 1992, the area was reestablished as the Taal Volcano Protected Landscape by Proclamation No. 906 on October 16, 1996. The protected area is managed by a Protected Area Management Board (PAMB) and has a Chief Operating Officer called a Protected Area Superintendent. A Management Plan was crafted and approved by the PAMB in 2009 and now serves as the blueprint for lake conservation.

History 
Taal Lake was once an inlet of nearby Balayan Bay, and was easily navigable from it. A series of major eruptions in the early 18th century battered the lakeside towns with earthquakes and volcanic debris. The activity culminated in 1754 with Taal Volcano's largest eruption that blocked Pansipit River with tephra, blocking the lake's sole outlet to the sea. This caused the waters to rise, eventually submerging several lakeside towns – the remnants of which are reportedly visible underwater to this day.

The poblaciones (town centres) of Lipa, Taal, Sala, Bauan, and Tanauan were abandoned and reestablished several kilometers away from the lakeshore after volcanic activity had subsided. Over a century hence, newer settlements along the lakeshore were carved from the larger towns: Talisay (established 1869, from Taal), Cuenca (1877, from San José), Alitagtag (1910, from Bauan), Mataasnakahoy (1932, from Lipa), Agoncillo (1949, from Lemery), San Nicolas (1955, over the ruins of old Taal), Laurel (1961, from Talisay), Santa Teresita (1961, from Taal, San Luis, and San Nicolas) and Balete (1969, from Lipa).

Ecology 
As the lake was previously connected to the sea, it is home to many endemic species that have evolved and adapted to the desalination of the lake's waters. The lake has a freshwater-adapted population of trevally, Caranx ignobilis. This fish, also found in Pansipit River, is locally called maliputo.  Its most popular endemic species is the overharvested Sardinella tawilis, a freshwater sardine. The two other endemic fish species in Taal Lake are the gobies Gnatholepis volcanus and Rhinogobius flavoventris.

Taal Lake is also home to one of the world's rarest sea snakes, Hydrophis semperi. This particular species is only one of two "true" sea snake (Hydrophiinae) species that are known to live entirely in freshwater (the other is Hydrophis sibauensis from the Sibua River, Borneo, Indonesia ). Bull sharks, Carcharhinus leucas, used to be part of the lake's once-diverse ecosystem but were extirpated by the locals by the 1930s.

Introduction of a non-native fish 
Jaguar guapote (Parachromis managuensis), a predatory piscivore, a carnivorous fish that primarily eats other fishes, was found illegally introduced into the lake.  The alien fish could proliferate in all areas of lake because of the abundant aquatic vegetation which they use for spawning and feeding, plenty of natural food, and favorable warm environment. Its presence could seriously affect the native fish population.

Fish kill 

On January 5, 2008, the Bureau of Fisheries and Aquatic Resources announced that a fish kill at Taal Lake (January 2 to 4) caused the 50 metric tons or ₱3.25-million ($79,268) loss of cultured tilapia in the villages of Leviste and Balakilong in Laurel and in Barangays Aya and Quiling in Talisay.  6,000 maliputo fishes ($5,609) also died at Quiling. Toxic sulfur and high level of hydrogen sulfide in Ambulong while low dissolved oxygen caused the deaths.

On May 30, 2011, the Bureau of Fisheries and Aquatic Resources announced a fish kill of 750 metric tons.  According to the scientists, the onset of the rainy season brought a sudden drop on the water temperature, which lowered the oxygen levels on the lake.

Tourism 

Regular tours of the lake are available to tourists. After crossing the lake, visitors travel to the top of Volcano Island on horseback. During their trip up and down the mountain, visitors have views of the lake and its surroundings.

Tagaytay in Cavite has benefited from Taal Lake and Taal Volcano, which is administered by neighboring province of Batangas. Many tourists have visited Tagaytay for a panoramic view of the lake and volcano.

In mid-2007, controversy ensued when the Korean firm Jung Ang Interventure was given clearance to build a health spa on Volcano Island along the lake's edge. Over the course of the next few weeks, several government officials expressed their disapproval of the construction project. On June 28, 2007, the Department of Environment and Natural Resources (DENR) suspended the Korean firm's environmental clearance certificate, rendering them incapable of pursuing further construction on the island until they secure other necessary permits. Because of the unpopular public reaction to the project, the Korean company's permit was permanently revoked by the DENR in early July 2007.

See also 

 Laguna de Bay
 Main Crater Lake

References

External links 

 
 Mysteries of Taal. Author Thomas Hargrove talks about the 1754 eruption that changed Taal Lake. 
 Trek to Taal Volcano. Guide to Taal Lake from Philippine Journeys.
 Some interesting Islands and Lakes

 
Lakes of the Philippines
Calderas of Southeast Asia
Volcanic crater lakes
Landforms of Batangas
Tourist attractions in Batangas